Frances Grey (born 1970 in Edinburgh) is a Scottish actress, perhaps most well known for her portrayal of D.S. Kate Beauchamp in the BBC television series Messiah (2001). The original production was based on a novel by Boris Starling.  Grey also starred in the subsequent installments Messiah 2: Vengeance is Mine (2003) and Messiah 3: the Promise (2004) which were written directly for television.

Early life
She attended The Mary Erskine School in Edinburgh, graduated from Goldsmiths, University of London with a degree in English and drama. Frances  then went on to study at the London Academy of Music and Dramatic Art.

Career
Some of her earlier roles were as Jane in the film Crimetime (1996), as Jenny Roach in the TV series Accused (1996), as Dr. Davies in the TV documentary series Living Proof (1997), as Amelia Sedley in the 1998 BBC adaptation of Vanity Fair. as Violet in the film Janice Beard 45 WPM,.(1999) as Jackie Brett in the TV series Reach for the Moon (2000) and as Elaine in the TV series The Secret World of Michael Fry (2000).

She also played as Lucy Slater in the TV series Murder in Mind (2002), as Jessie in the TV series The Key (2003), as Ellie Peters in the TV series  The Bill (2005), as Caroline Jensen in the TV series Sea of Souls (2006), as Hannah in the TV series Where the Heart is (2006), as Suzanne in the play Monks by Des Dillon in Edinburgh in 2007, as Louise Whately and Liz Beamish in the TV soap Casualty (2005 and 2008), as Janice Hylton in the TV series Foyle's War (2008) as Caroline Page and Rhona Campbell in the Scottish TV series Taggart (1997 and 2008) and as prison psychiatrist Marianne McKee in BBC Scotland's TV soap-opera River City (2009).

Grey played as Mary Place in the TV series Garrow's Law (2009), as Samantha Jackson in the short film Downturn (2010), as Sonia Thomas and Natalie Layfield in the TV series Doctors (2007 and 2011), as Janice in the TV film in three parts The Widower (2014), as Jess Collins in the TV detective series Shetland (2014), as Slan Gleeson in the TV medical soap Holby City (2014) and as Al Ferguson in the short film Perfect State (2014). In 2014 she was filming the TV series Home Fires.

Personal life
She was married to Nick Powell from 2005 to 2011. She has one child with playwright John Donnelly.

Filmography

Film

Television

Radio

Theatre credits

References 

Living people
Scottish radio actresses
Scottish television actresses
1970 births
Actresses from Edinburgh
People educated at the Mary Erskine School
Alumni of Goldsmiths, University of London
Alumni of the London Academy of Music and Dramatic Art